Eurasia: The Conquest of the East, also known as Eurasian Empires or simply Eurasia, is a documentary TV series about the Eurasian civilisations, which ran in eight episodes on NHK (2003) and France 5 (2004). It started on 20 April 2003, with the final episode broadcast on 14 December 2003. The series has been dubbed into English and Spanish.

Synopsis 
New discoveries and studies have shown that Central Asia, a region located in the centre of Eurasia, played a significant role as a "cradle of civilisation". The civilisations brought to the vast Eurasian continent by conquest and trade continued to collide and fuse, affecting each other and developing new civilisations. Computer-generated imagery is used to recreate the historical scenes of Ai-Khanoum, Babylon, Baghdad, Persepolis, Rome, etc., representing the rise and fall of a dynamic civilisation that took place over 2000 years.

Episodes

DVD 
The series has been released on DVD by TF1 vidéo in 2004. A new edition titled , has been released in 2006. The Japanese DVD box has been released in 2004, by NHK software.

Adaptation 

 Comic books
  ('Alexander: Dream of the World Empire')
  ('Kublai: Completion of the World Empire')

 Book series
  ('Era of Alexander the Great')
  ('Hellenism and Buddhism')
  ('The Silk Road on Land and Sea')
  ('Islam and the Crusades')
  ('Mongol Empire')

References

External links 
  

NHK original programming
France Télévisions original programming
French documentary films
French documentary television series
2003 Japanese television series debuts
2003 Japanese television series endings
2004 French television series debuts
2004 French television series endings
Japanese documentary television films
Japanese documentary television series
Books based on television series
Television shows adapted into comics
Films about Alexander the Great